The Chincha Islands War, also known as Spanish–South American War, was a series of coastal and naval battles between Spain and its former colonies of Peru, Chile, Ecuador, and Bolivia from 1865 to 1879. The conflict began with Spain's seizure of the guano-rich Chincha Islands in one of a series of attempts by Spain, under Isabella II, to reassert its influence over its former South American colonies. The war saw the use of ironclads, including the Spanish ship Numancia, the first ironclad to circumnavigate the world.

Background

Military expenditures were greatly increased during Isabella's reign and Spain rose to a position as the world's fourth largest naval power. In the 1850's and 1860's, the Spanish engaged in colonial activities around the world, including in Morocco, the Philippines, Mexico, and the Dominican Republic, the last of which it briefly reoccupied.

At the end of 1862, Spain sent a scientific expedition to South American waters with the covert purpose of reinforcing the financial and legal claims of Spanish citizens residing in the Americas. The expedition was under the command of Admiral Luis Hernández-Pinzón Álvarez, a direct descendant of the Pinzón brothers, who had accompanied Christopher Columbus on his voyage that resulted in the modern European discovery of the Americas. Pinzón's squadron was composed of four warships: the twin steam frigates Triunfo and Resolución, the corvette Vencedora and the schooner Virgen de Covadonga.

The Spanish ships arrived at the port of Valparaiso, Chile, on April 18, 1863. Spain had recognized Chilean independence since the 1840s, and both nations had maintained diplomatic relations. The expedition was cordially received, and the Admiral exchanged visits with local authorities. The vessels left Chile in July amicably and moved on to Peru. Even though Spain had never recognized Peruvian independence, which had been declared in 1821, the squadron received a friendly welcome at the port of Callao. It stayed in port for a few weeks and then sailed bound for San Francisco, California, United States.

Talambo incident
On August 4, 1863, an incident took place at the Talambo hacienda, in Lambayeque, Peru. The details are fragmentary; but the episode involved a fight that broke out between two Spanish residents and 40 local citizens. As a result, one Spaniard died, and four others were injured.

When news of the incident reached Pinzón, he returned with his fleet to Peru on November 13 and demanded for its government to issue an apology and for reparations be made to the affected Spanish nationals. In response, the Peruvians took the position that the episode was an internal police matter that should be handled by the Peruvian justice system and that no apology was due. At that juncture, the Spanish government in Madrid decided to demand payment of Peruvian debts stemming from the War of Independence as well, and it sent the representative Eusebio de Salazar y Mazarredo to settle the issue directly with the Peruvian authorities.

Salazar arrived in March 1864, bearing the title of Royal Commissary. That was a deliberate insult to the government of Peru because a commissary is a colonial functionary, rather than an ambassador, the normal level of diplomatic contact during consultations between independent states. The snub doomed negotiations with the Peruvian Minister of Foreign Affairs, Juan Antonio Ribeyro Estrada.

Occupation of Chincha Islands

On April 14, 1864, in retaliation for Peru's refusal to pay an indemnity, the Spanish fleet seized the lightly defended Chincha Islands, the main source for Peruvian guano resources. The Spanish placed the islands' Peruvian governor, Ramón Valle Riestra, under arrest aboard the Resolución, occupied the islands with 400 marines, and raised the Spanish flag. Spain considered the islands an important bargaining chip, as they were a major Peruvian economic asset and produced almost 60% of the government's annual revenue.

The Spanish squadron also blockaded principal Peruvian ports, disrupting commerce and fostering a high level of resentment throughout Latin America. Spain expected little resistance from Peru and believed its military capabilities to be negligible. A proposal to exchange the islands for British-held Gibraltar was even entertained for a time. During the blockade, the Spanish lost the Triunfo after it was destroyed by an accidental fire.

The new Spanish Prime Minister, Ramón María Narváez, disapproved of the unilateral actions taken by Pinzón and replaced him with Vice Admiral Juan Manuel Pareja, who had been Minister of the Navy. Pareja had been born in Peru, and his father, Brigadier Antonio Pareja, had died in Chile in 1813 while he was fighting for Spain during the Chilean War of Independence. Narváez's conciliatory opinion soon changed, and he dispatched another four warships to reinforce the Pacific fleet.

Pareja arrived in Peru in December 1864 and immediately opened negotiations with General Manuel Ignacio de Vivanco, the special representative of Peruvian President Juan Antonio Pezet. The Vivanco-Pareja Treaty was signed on January 27, 1865 on board the frigate Villa de Madrid. Popular opinion in Peru considered the treaty as detrimental to its national honor. When the Peruvian Congress refused to ratify it, a general uprising followed, and Pezet's government fell on November 7.

War with Chile
In the meantime, anti-Spanish sentiments in several South American countries, including Bolivia, Chile, and Ecuador, increased. Peru and its neighbors still remained wary of any moves that might foreshadow an attempt to re-establish the Spanish Empire. Given the climate of suspicion, no one was surprised when the Spanish gunboat Vencedora stopped at a Chilean port for coal, and President José Joaquín Pérez declared that coal was a war supply that could not be sold to a belligerent nation.

From the Spanish point of view, the Chilean coaling embargo was taken as proof that Chile no longer was neutral. That was reinforced after two Peruvian steamers left the port of Valparaiso bearing weapons and Chilean volunteers bound for Peru. Vice Admiral José Manuel Pareja thus took a hard line and demanded sanctions against Chile that were even heavier than those imposed upon Peru. He then detached four wooden ships from his squadron and dispatched them to Chile while the Numancia and the Covadonga remained to guard Callao.

Pareja arrived at Valparaiso on September 17, 1865 aboard his flagship the Villa de Madrid. He demanded for the Spanish flag to be given a 21-gun salute. He deliberately presented his demand on the day before Chilean National Day (September 18). Under the circumstances, the Chileans refused, and war was declared a week later on September 24.

The new Spanish prime minister, Leopoldo O'Donnell, who had replaced Narváez, ordered Pareja to withdraw, but the Spanish admiral chose to ignore the direct order. As he had no troops with which to attempt a landing, he decided to impose a blockade of the main Chilean ports. That action was unenforceable since a blockade of Chile's  of coastline would have required a fleet that was several times larger than what Pareja had at his disposal. The blockade of the port of Valparaiso, however, caused such great economic damage to both Chilean and foreign interests that the navies of the United States and Great Britain, despite remaining neutral in the conflict, issued a formal protest.

Battle of Papudo

Even before Chile and Peru were formally allied, Spain had suffered a humiliating naval defeat at the naval Battle of Papudo on November 26, 1865. The engagement had the Chilean corvette Esmeralda capture the Spanish schooner Covadonga, taking the crew prisoner and seizing the admiral's war correspondence. That humiliation was too much for Pareja, who committed suicide two days later aboard his flagship. The general command of the Spanish fleet in the Pacific was assumed by Commodore Casto Méndez Núñez, who quickly received a promotion to rear admiral. He then decided to flee, leaving behind a sizeable army and treasure.

War with Peru, Ecuador, and Bolivia

On November 7, 1865, his unwillingness to declare war on Spain and the vilification arising from his signing of the Vivanco-Pareja Treaty forced Peruvian President Juan Antonio Pezet from office. He was replaced by his vice president, General Pedro Diez Canseco.

Diez Canseco also tried to avoid war with Spain, which similarly led to his downfall only 20 days later. On November 26, General Mariano Ignacio Prado, the leader of the nationalist movement, deposed Canseco. The new government immediately declared its solidarity with Chile and its intention to declare war on Spain and to restore Peru's national honor.

Chile and Peru formally signed an alliance against Spain on December 5, 1865. The Peruvian Congress ratified the alliance on January 12, and two days later, Peru finally declared war on Spain. Chile's navy was weak and almost nonexistent. To reinforce its Chilean ally, a Peruvian squadron, commanded by Captain Lizardo Montero, was immediately dispatched to the south. Among the ships in the squadron were the steam frigates Amazonas and Apurímac.

Ecuador joined the alliance on January 30, 1866 by declaring war on Spain on that day. Bolivia, under the command of General Mariano Melgarejo, also declared war on March 22, 1866. The moves resulted in all ports on South America's Pacific coast becoming closed to the Spanish fleet. Argentina and Brazil refused to join the alliance, as they were embroiled in a war with Paraguay.

Battle of Abtao

Spain's Admiral Mendez Núñez sent two of his most powerful ships (the frigates Villa de Madrid and Reina Blanca) south to destroy the combined Chilean-Peruvian fleet. The Allied squadron had been placed under the command of Peruvian Captain Manuel Villar and had taken refuge at Abtao, a well-protected inlet near the gulf of Chiloé, in southern Chile. The Spanish squadron appeared at the entrance of the inlet on February 7, 1866, but the Spanish did not enter to avoid risking their ironclads running aground in the shallows. A cannonade, lasting several hours, was exchanged with little effect. In spite of being at anchor, without steam, and with some ships with their engines undergoing overhaul, the Allies mounted an energetic fight. The Covadonga, under the command of Lieutenant Manuel Thomson, managed to fire over an island and scored several hits on the frigate Blanca. The battle ended indecisively without further developments. Reluctant to enter shallow waters and realizing that a long-range gun duel would serve no purpose but to waste ammunition, the Spanish commanders withdrew.

Williams and the Esmeralda were not at the anchorage on the day of the battle. The commodore had sailed to Ancud for coaling. On its way back to Valparaiso, the Spanish squadron captured a Chilean steamboat, the Paquete del Maule, which was transporting sailors to crew the new Peruvian ironclads Huáscar and Independencia.

Bombardment of Valparaiso

The Spanish could not attack land forces and had been frustrated in attempts to engage the Allied squadron at sea. The Spanish ships were isolated, short of supplies, and losing hope of victory. When the Chilean government ordered all vessels communicating with the Spanish fleet to be barred from Chilean ports, Admiral Mendez Núñez decided to take punitive actions against the Allied ports. The Spanish fleet shelled and burned the town and the port of Valparaiso on March 31 and destroyed Chile's merchant fleet. A total of 33 vessels were burned or sunk. The damage to the Chilean merchant marine was catastrophic. Twelve years later, the total tonnage under the Chilean flag was still less than half of what it had been in 1865.

Battle of Callao

Admiral Mendez Núñez, displeased at having to resort to destroying defenseless targets such as Valparaiso and with the inconclusive result at Abtao, decided to change tactics and to attack a heavily defended port. As a result, he set sail for the Peruvian port city of Callao. The Battle of Callao took place on May 2 after which both sides claimed victory. Peruvian defenders claimed that they had halted the Spanish from regaining their lost authority and prestige in South America, prevented them from enforcing their demands upon Peru, and forced the withdrawal of the Spanish fleet, which was technically correct since Peruvian cannons fired the last shots in the battle. The Spanish claimed to have visited punishment upon its former colony. Spanish guns had managed to cause only limited damage to defenses, and most of the cannons, artillery, and buildings in Callao itself survived the battle intact.

Aftermath
Whether the suspicions of a Spanish scheme to recapture its former colonies had any basis in fact is unknown. Many in South America saw Spain's meddling in Latin America and its occupation of the Chincha Islands as proof of a long-range Spanish plot to reassert its influence over its previous colonial territories. The force sent by Spain, on the other hand, amounted to a mere squadron of ships with negligible capabilities for landing forces, and its intention may have been only to seize the islands for their valuable fertiliser resources as reparations and to regain some of Spain's lost prestige. Regardless of the reason behind the conflict, Spain found it impossible to hold its positions. With all ports south of Colombia closed to it for coaling and provisioning, the Spanish fleet withdrew from patrolling the South American coastline, vacated the Chincha Islands, and returned to Spain via the Philippines, completing a circumnavigation of the globe to do so.

Commemoration
The  ("Pacific street", now ) in Madrid, Spain, was named after this campaign. 
The street gave name to a neighborhood and metro station.

Order of battle

Spain
General Commanders
Vice-Admiral Luis Hernández Pinzón (1863–1864)
Vice-Admiral José Manuel Pareja (1864–1865)
Rear-Admiral Casto Méndez Núñez (1865–1866)

Steam-schooners
Vencedora, Built 1861; Weight 778 tons; Speed ; weapons two 200 mm revolving guns and two 160 mm guns.
Virgen de Covadonga, Built 1864; Weight 445 tons; Speed 8 knots; Weapons two revolving 200 mm guns at the sides and one revolving 160 mm guns at the prow. Captured by Chile at Battle of Papudo on November 26, 1865.

Steamboats
Marqués de la Victoria – 3 guns

Sail transports
Consuelo
Mataura

Peru

General Commanders
Captain Lizardo Montero
Captain Manuel Villar

Screw-frigates
Apurímac – Built 1854; Weight 1,666-tons; Speed ; Weapons thirty-four guns
Amazonas – Built 1851; Weight 1,743-tons; Speed ; Weapons thirty-three 200 mm guns – Beached at Abtao, near Punta Quilque, 15 January 1886
Steam-schooners
Tumbes – Built 1854; Weight 250-tons; Speed ; Weapons two 68-pounder guns

Steamboats
Chalaco – Built 1864 – 2 guns
Colón – Built 1864 – 2 guns

Ironclad monitors
Loa – Built 1854, conversion to ironclad ordered in 1864; Weight 648-tons; Speed ; Weapons four 32 pdr. guns
Victoria – Built 1865; 1 gun

Chile

General Commanders
Captain Juan Williams Rebolledo

Corvette 
Esmeralda – Built in 1854, 854-ton weight, speed of 8 knots (14.82 km / h), armed with two guns boat 12 lb, 16 smoothbore muzzle-loading guns of 32 lb and 4 smooth-bore muzzle-loading guns of 32 lb.

Steam-schooners
Virgen de Covadonga – Built 1864; Weight 445-tons; Speed 8 knots (15 km/h); Weapons two revolving 200 mm guns at the sides and one revolving 160 mm guns at the prow. Captured by Chile at Battle of Papudo on November 26, 1865.

Transports
Paquete del Maule – Captured by Spain; Speed ; armament 2 guns.

Steamers 
Maipú – Built 1855 in England; Acquired 1857; Displacement 450 tons; Speed 8 knots; armed with 1 68 lb gun and 4 32 lb guns
 Lautauro – Built 1852; Given by Peru to Chile for wartime use 1865; Displacement 450 tons

Notes

Sources

Further reading

External links

 
Conflicts in 1866
History of South America
Spanish colonization of the Americas
1866 in Chile
1866 in Peru
1866 in Spain
1866 in Ecuador
1866 in Bolivia
1864 in Chile
1864 in Peru
1864 in Spain
1865 in Chile
1865 in Peru
1865 in Spain
Conflicts in 1864
Conflicts in 1865